The Coca-Cola Roxy is a concert venue located in The Battery Atlanta in Cumberland, Georgia. Named after the old Roxy Theatre, the venue opened in April 2017.

History 
On July 16, 2015, the Atlanta Braves and concert promoter Live Nation Entertainment announced a deal to develop and manage the long-planned entertainment venue adjacent to Truist Park. Named in homage to the old Roxy Theatre that was torn down in 1972, the venue was announced to have standing-room-only capacity for 4,000 and feature about 40 music and comic shows annually, was designed to help drive activity to the site on non-gamedays, and planned to host special events.

The Coca-Coca Roxy officially opened on April 8, 2017, with Radio 105.7's 4th Birthday Bash featuring Glass Animals.

Layout 
The  theater consists of two tiers. The floor area is flat, unlike similar venues, such as the Tabernacle, that slope upward. Upstairs is a permanent seating area that consists of 800 seats. There are four public bars in the venue, with a fifth located in the VIP room.

References 

Music venues completed in 2017
Concert halls in the United States
Music venues in Georgia (U.S. state)
Esports venues in Georgia (U.S. state)
Atlanta Reign
2017 establishments in Georgia (U.S. state)